Chinook is a cross between 'Bing' and 'Gil Peck' and was introduced in 1960 by Harold Fogle. 'Chinook' is similar to Bing but is sweeter and ripens 4 to 10 days sooner. 'Chinook' is a cross-pollinizer with 'Bing' and 'Van'.

'Chinook' was introduced as a black-fruited pollinizer for 'Bing' that could be shipped fresh. It has been removed from orchards because of its relatively soft flesh and serious rain cracking.

References

Cherry cultivars